Protarctos is an extinct genus of ursine bear that lived in North America during the Pliocene.

Description
Protarctos was about the same size as an Asiatic black bear. Originally described from a tooth found in Idaho, more complete remains of this species have been found in Ellesmere Island, Nunavut, Canada.

Palaeoecology
Protarctos would have lived in a northern boreal-type forest habitat, where there would have been 24-hour darkness in winter, as well as about six months of ice and snow.

Fossils of two different specimens, one a subadult, show signs of dental cavities which suggests its diet included high amounts of fermentable carbohydrates. This is the first and earliest documented occurrence of high-calorie diet in early bears, likely related to fat storage in preparation for the harsh Arctic winters.

References

Prehistoric bears
Pliocene mammals of North America
Prehistoric mammal genera